Tay Eng Soon (20 January 1940 – 5 August 1993) was a Singaporean politician.

Education 
Tay was educated at the Anglo-Chinese School for his primary and secondary education. He was the top student for both schools. He obtained first class honours in Bachelor of Science from the University of Bristol, Masters and Doctor of Philosophy from the University of London.

Political career 

Tay was a Member of Parliament for River Valley Constituency with walkovers in both 1980 and 1984 General Election. 

He was appointed Minister of State for Education in 1981 and Senior Minister of State for Education in 1988. 

Tay was part of a three-member PAP team against the Worker's Party team for Eunos GRC. The PAP defeated WP with 50.89% of the valid votes in the 1988 general election.

During the 1984 General Election, Tay was part of the four-member PAP team against the  Worker's Party team. The PAP team defeated the WP team for the second time with 52.28% of the valid votes. Tay was a Member of Parliament of Eunos GRC for Tampines North ward from 1988 to 1993 as he died on 5 August 1993 due to heart failure while his term in office.

Personal life 
Tay was married to Rosalyn Carson, a scientist, and had 2 daughters and a son.

Tay was hospitalised on 2 August 1993 and died of acute heart failure on 5 August.

Legacy 
One of the two libraries at the Singapore Institute of Management is named after him, in recognition of Tay's contributions to the SIM's UK Open University Degree Programme.

The Tay Eng Soon Health Sciences Award, Tay Eng Soon Gold Medal, and Tay Eng Soon Convention Centre at ITE College Central are named after him.

References

External links
 

People's Action Party politicians
1940 births
1993 deaths
Anglo-Chinese School alumni